Sodium benzenesulfonate is an organic compound with the formula .  It is white, water-soluble solid,  It is produced by the neutralization benzenesulfonic acid with sodium hydroxide.  It is also a common ingredient in some detergents.  The compound typically crystallizes from water as the monohydrate.

Heating this salt in strong base results in desulfonation, giving, after acid workup, phenol This reaction was at one time, the principal route to phenol.

References

Sulfonyl groups
Leaving groups
Sulfonates